The 1980–81 Syracuse Orangemen men's basketball team represented Syracuse University in NCAA Division I men's competition in the 1980–81 academic year.

Schedule

|-
!colspan=9 style=| Big East tournament

|-
!colspan=9 style=| NIT

References 

Syracuse
Syracuse Orange men's basketball seasons
Syracuse Orange
Syracuse Orange
Syracuse